Kalybose in China is a Ghanaian comedic movie in which the main character Kalybose will do anything for his true love, Ahuofe Partri. Kalybose goes to China to make more money. He is assisted by a connected man with acquiring the particulars necessary for traveling there.

Cast
Richard Asante (Kalybos)
Priscilla Agyemang (Ahuofe Patri)
Christabel Ekeh
David Dontoh, 
Mikki Osei Berko
Nikki Samonas 
John Dumelo

References

Ghanaian comedy films
2010s English-language films
English-language Ghanaian films